Elections to Rochdale Council were held on 7 May 1998.  One third of the council was up for election and the Labour Party kept overall control of the council where they defeated the Liberal Democrats in 1996.

After the election, the composition of the council was:
 Labour 36
 Liberal Democrat 18
 Conservative 6

Election result

References

 "Council poll results", The Guardian 9 May 1998 page 16

1998 English local elections
1998
1990s in Greater Manchester